The second season of The O.C. commenced airing in the United States on November 4, 2004, concluded on May 19, 2005, and consisted of 24 episodes. It aired Thursdays at 8:00 p.m. ET in the US on FOX, a terrestrial television network. In addition to the regular 24 episodes, two special episodes aired before the season premiere. "The O.C.: Obsess Completely" documented the show's influence on popular culture in its first year. The following week, "Welcome to The O.C.: A Day in the Life," provided a behind-the-scenes look at the show.

The season was released on DVD as a seven-disc boxed set under the title The O.C.: The Complete Second Season on August 23, 2005, by Warner Bros. Home Video. On September 7, 2008, the season became available to purchase for registered users of the US iTunes Store. In the United Kingdom the season premiered January 11, 2005 on Channel 4. In Canada the season aired on CTV Television Network and in Australia it was broadcast by Network Ten.

Synopsis 
Ryan, Marissa, Summer, and Seth enter their Junior year, but have serious tension between  them all that has been building all summer.  Kirsten and Julie navigates new water as mother and daughter, while Julie's crime filled past comes back to haunt her. Ryan's older ex-con brother Trey gives Newport a try.

Cast and characters

Regular

 Peter Gallagher as Sandy Cohen (24 episodes)
 Kelly Rowan as Kirsten Cohen (24 episodes)
 Benjamin McKenzie as Ryan Atwood (24 episodes)
 Mischa Barton as Marissa Cooper (24 episodes)
 Adam Brody as Seth Cohen (24 episodes)
 Melinda Clarke as Julie Cooper (21 episodes)
 Rachel Bilson as Summer Roberts (24 episodes)
 Alan Dale as Caleb Nichol (19 episodes)
 Tate Donovan as Jimmy Cooper (8 episodes)

Recurring
 Michael Cassidy as Zach Stevens (19 episodes)
 Olivia Wilde as Alex Kelly (13 episodes)
 Shannon Lucio as Lindsay Gardener (12 episodes)
 Logan Marshall-Green as Trey Atwood (8 episodes)
 Billy Campbell as Carter Buckley (7 episodes)
 Nikki Griffin as Jess Sathers (7 episodes)
 Nicholas Gonzalez as DJ (6 episodes) 
 Johnny Messner as Lance Baldwin (5 episodes)
 Kim Delaney as Rebecca Bloom (4 episodes)
 Marguerite Moreau as Reed Carlson (4 episodes) 
 Kathleen York as Renee Wheeler (4 episodes)

Special Guest starring
 Amanda Righetti as Hailey Nichol (2 episodes)
 Navi Rawat as Theresa Diaz (2 episodes)
 Chris Carmack as Luke Ward (1 episode)
 George Lucas as himself (1 episode)

Episodes

Notes
 - These episodes were first shown in Canada at 8:00 p.m. ET on CTV. In America the airing of "The Return of the Nana" was postponed due to a press conference by President Bush. Instead it aired the following week at 8:00 p.m. ET immediately followed by "The Showdown" at 9:00 p.m.

Crew
The season was produced by Warner Bros. Television and Wonderland Sound and Vision. The executive producers were series creator Josh Schwartz, McG and Bob DeLaurentis. Stephanie Savage and Allan Heinberg served as co-executive producers, with Loucas George credited as producer. The staff writers were Schwartz, Savage, Heinberg, John Stephens, J.J. Philbin and Mike Kelley. The regular directors throughout the season were Michael Lange, Ian Toynton, Michael Fresco and Tony Wharmby.

Cast

The second season had star billing for nine major roles. Peter Gallagher as Sandy Cohen, Kelly Rowan as Kirsten Cohen, Ben McKenzie as Ryan Atwood, Mischa Barton as Marissa Cooper, Adam Brody as Seth Cohen, Melinda Clarke as recently married Julie Cooper-Nichol and Rachel Bilson as Summer Roberts all returned to the main cast. Tate Donovan also initially reprised his role as Jimmy Cooper, but was written out of the series in the seventh episode. However Donovan returned with Jimmy as a guest star in the season finale. Alan Dale, as newly wed Caleb Nichol, joined the main cast, having previously been a recurring role. Former main cast member Chris Carmack, who portrayed Luke Ward, only guest starred in the first episode.

Nicholas Gonzalez (as D.J.), Michael Cassidy (as Zach Stevens), Shannon Lucio (as Lindsay Gardner) and Olivia Wilde (as Alex Kelly) all took up recurring roles in the show as love interests of existing characters, Marissa, Summer, Ryan and Seth, who are all single now.

Actors returning as guest stars included Amanda Righetti (as Hailey Nichol), Michael Nouri (as Dr. Neil Roberts), Navi Rawat (as Theresa Diaz), Brian McNamara (as Carson Ward), Kim Oja (as Taryn Baker) and Linda Lavin (as The Nana). Ryan's brother Trey Atwood also returned, but Logan Marshall-Green replaced Bradley Stryker in portraying him. Other guest stars in new recurring roles included Billy Campbell, as magazine editor Carter Buckley, Kim Delaney, as Sandy's ex-fiancée Rebecca Bloom, Johnny Messner, as Julie's ex-boyfriend Lance Baldwin, Kathleen York, as mother of Caleb's illegitimate child Renee Wheeler, Nikki Griffin as party girl and drug addict Jess Sathers and Marguerite Moreau, as Reed Carlson the Vice President of a graphic novel company, and Max Burkholder as a child in airport, with a toy similar to Captain Oats, in "The Rainy Day Women"

Reception
The second season was widely received as inferior to the first, but it has been noted that this may be slightly unfair.
The show moved to "ultra-competitive Thursday" nights which Schwartz described as a "real vote of confidence [from] the network", but many attributed placing The O.C. against the likes of Survivor, Joey and Will & Grace as part of The O.C.'s decline in popularity. The move improved FOX's performance at the new time slot, but lost the show viewers. The season premiere attracted 8.6 million viewers, but average viewing figures decreased thirty percent from the previous season to 7 million.

For the second season the show was nominated for five Teen Choice Awards winning four of them, including best drama. It was also nominated for the Favorite Television Drama People's Choice Award. Kelly Rowan won a PRISM Award for Performance in a Drama Series Episode, with Peter Gallagher also getting nominated. Additionally the season finale was nominated for the TV Drama Series Episode award. The introduction of bisexual character Alex, was praised as "an especially charismatic new presence", with the show was praised for its handling of her lesbian relationship with Marissa. However Mischa Barton was criticized for her acting skills in portraying Marissa, alongside other noted flaws including "flavorless plots," and "flat new characters who failed to grab the audience's interest". IGN faulted the move to quickly rekindle the Ryan and Marissa relationship and "abruptly write off Alex and Lindsay, after [making] them a pretty big part of the show" but commended a "compelling story centering on Ryan's brother Trey coming to town, leading to a very dramatic season finale" Tate Donovan, who played Jimmy, credited a drop in ratings to "the show moving away from the family dynamic to focus more on the kids".

DVD release
The DVD release of season two was released by Warner Bros. in the US on August 23, 2005, after it had completed broadcast on television. As well as every episode from the season, the DVD release features bonus material including a gag reel, audio commentary and a fashion featurette.

 : - In the UK the DVD was released as a 6-disc set. Omitted was the US release seventh disc that featured Beachy Couture, Obsess Completely and the two season gag reel.

References

External links
 Episode guide at Warner Bros.' The OC Insider
 

Season 2
2004 American television seasons
2005 American television seasons